John Boteler may refer to:
 Sir John le Boteler (c. 1328–1399), MP for Lancashire 1366–97
 John Boteler (1402–1430), MP for Lancashire 1425–26
 John Boteler, 1st Baron Boteler of Brantfield (c. 1566–1637), MP for Hertfordshire 1625–26
 John Boteler (1587–1653), MP for Hertfordshire 1625–26
 John Boteler (died 1746) MP for Hythe 1701–10 and 1711–15
 John Boteler (1684–1774), MP for Hertford 1715–22 and Wendover 1734–35

See also
 John Boteler Parker (1786–1851), English army general
 John Butler (disambiguation)